Tadaryat is a village in Yagha Province, Burkina Faso.  A massacre occurred in Tadaryat in June 2021.

References

Yagha Province
Villages in Burkina Faso